Giorgio Ausiello is an Italian computer scientist. Born in 1941, in 1966 he graduated in Physics under the supervision of Corrado Böhm. From 1966 to 1980 he served as researcher at the Italian National Research Council (CNR). In 1980 he became Professor of Compilers and Operating Systems at Sapienza University of Rome and since 1990 he has been Professor of Theoretical Computer Science in the Department of Computer, Control and Management Engineering, where he has been until recently the leader of the research group on Algorithm Engineering. At academic level Giorgio Ausiello has been Chairman of the degree in Computer Engineering, Director of the Graduate School, then member of the Academic Senate and finally Chairman of the Research Committee of Sapienza University. In 2012 he has been nominated Professor Emeritus of Sapienza University of Rome.

Throughout his research career Ausiello has addressed various research domains ranging from theory of programming to algorithms and complexity. Major scientific contributions concern database theory, approximability of NP-hard optimization problems, dynamic and online algorithms, graph algorithms, directed hypergraph algorithms. Most of the research work has been carried on in cooperation with some of the main European academic groups in the context of EU research projects.

Ausiello has contributed to several initiatives for the development of theoretical computer science in Italy and in Europe. In 1972 he was among the founders of the European Association for Theoretical Computer Science (EATCS) of which he has been President from 2006 to 2009. In 2014 he has been nominated Fellow of EATCS. In 1997, with Jozef Gruska, he took part in the creation of the IFIP Technical Committee for 'Foundations of Computer Science' (IFIP-TC1) and was the first Chairman of TC1.

From 2001 to 2015 Ausiello has been Editor in Chief of the journal Theoretical Computer Science Series A (Algorithms, Automata, Complexity and Games). He is also co-Editor in Chief of the Springer series "Advanced Research in Computing and in Software Science" (ARCoSS, a subline of LNCS), member of the Advisory Board of the "Monograph series of EATCS", member of the Editorial Board of the International Journal of Foundations of Computer Science, member of the Editorial Board of Computer Science Review.  He has been elected member of Academia Europaea in 1996. In 2004 he has become Doctor Honoris Causa of the Paris-Dauphine University.

At international level he has been Italian national representative in the Board of EU IST research programs (1988-1994 and 2006-2009) and member of the Board of Trustees of the International Computer Science Institute, Berkeley, USA. (1997-2001).  In Italy he has consulted for some of the main research institutions in the field. Since 1979 to 1994 he has been involved in the major national research efforts in informatics as member of the scientific board of the CNR projects "Informatics", "Robotics" and "Information Systems and Parallel Computing".

Books
 G. Ausiello 'Complessità di calcolo delle funzioni', Boringhieri, 1974.
 G. Ausiello, A. Marchetti-Spaccamela, M. Protasi 'Teoria e progetto di algoritmi fondamentali', Franco Angeli, 1985.
 G. Ausiello, P. Crescenzi, G. Gambosi, V. Kann, A. Marchetti-Spaccamela, M. Protasi 'Complexity and Approximation. Combinatorial Optimization Problems and their Approximability Properties', Springer, 1999.
 G. Ausiello, R. Petreschi 'The Power of Algorithms' Springer, 2013.
 G. Ausiello, F. d'Amore, G. Gambosi, L. Laura 'Linguaggi, Modelli, Complessità', Franco Angeli, 2014.

References

External links

1941 births
Living people
Italian computer scientists
Academic staff of the Sapienza University of Rome
People from Dogliani